We Got Married was a South Korean reality variety show that aired on MBC from 2008 to 2017. The show paired up celebrities who pretended to be married couples and completed various challenges together. The show ran for four seasons and inspired several spin-offs, including a "global edition" of the show that featured non-Korean celebrities.

Pilot special
The show's pilot episode was aired on 6 February 2008 as a Korean New Year special. On the episode, four arranged celebrity couples had to prepare dinner with a fixed amount of money.

Couples
 Alex & Jang Yoon-jeong
 Jung Hyung-don & Saori
 Crown J & Seo In-young
 Hong Kyung-min& Solbi

Season 1

With a new format and slightly different couples, newlyweds are given a mission to complete each week. As during the special pilot episode, interviewed participants provide a unique perspective on the ongoing relationship conflicts and developments. All of the recorded material is then played in front of the participants, MCs, and audience who add commentary or clarification.

Beginning with a Lunar New Year's Special in 2009 with three new couples, a new format is introduced into the show, first forecasted through the addition of Kangin and Lee Yoon-ji. Each couple is given a concept to portray; in Kangin and Lee Yoon-ji's case, a college couple living with a limited income.

Original couples
 Alex & Shin Ae (Ep 1-8, 13-34)
 Crown J & Seo In-young (Ep 1-41)
 Shinhwa's Andy & Solbi (Ep 1-28)
 Jung Hyung-don & Saori (Ep 1-8)

Additional couples
 Lee Hwi-jae & Cho Yeo-jeong (Ep 9-17)
 SS501's Kim Hyun-joong & Hwangbo (Ep 9-38)
 Hwanhee & Hwayobi (Ep 25, 29-44)
 Marco & Son Dam-bi (Ep 25, 29-44)
 Choi Jin-young & Lee Hyun-ji (Ep 25)
 Super Junior's Kangin & Lee Yoon-ji (Ep 39-55)
 Jung Hyung-don & Girls' Generation's Taeyeon (Ep 42-54)
 Shin Sung-rok & Kim Shin-young (Ep 42, 45-54)
 Shinhwa's Jun Jin & Lee Si-young (Ep 42, 45-55)

Season 2

As of May 2009, the producers announced another change in the format with all four couples departing, cutting down to just one couple and shortening the show to just 60 minutes. The show will now portray a more realistic side to what a marriage is, instead of "the painted image of marriage based on romance". For the first time, a real couple is cast in the show. Guest celebrities are invited to be show's commentators for each episode so that they can share their opinions on marriage on behalf of their age group. SG Wannabe's Kim Yong-jun and Hwang Jung-eum also do the interview room together dressed in wedding attire.

However, due to low ratings, the show returned to its old format with the addition of a make-believe couple actor Park Jae-jung and After School member Uee on 2 August 2009. For the Chuseok special, Brown Eyed Girls' Gain & 2AM's Jo Kwon and SG Wannabe's Lee Seok-hun & host Kim Na-young appeared as two new couples. The episode achieved Season 2's highest rating, and Gain and Jo Kwon were announced to be a permanent couple.

Couple List (New Format)
 SG Wannabe's Kim Yong-jun & Hwang Jung-eum (Ep 56-66)

Couple List (Old Format)
 SG Wannabe's Kim Yong-jun & Hwang Jung-eum (Ep 1-20)
 Park Jae-jung & After School's Uee (Ep 1-20)
 2AM's Jo Kwon & Brown Eyed Girls' Gain (ep 10-69)
 SG Wannabe's Lee Seok-hoon & Kim Na-young (Ep 10)
 Lee Sun-ho & Hwang Woo-seul-hye (ep 21-31)
 CNBLUE's Jung Yong-hwa & Girls' Generation's Seohyun (Ep 29-80)
 2PM's Nichkhun & f(x)'s Victoria (ep 41-80)

Season 3

Season three officially begins on 9 April, with two additional couples upon the departure of Yonghwa & Seohyun, as well as a new format. Park Hwi-sun and K.Will are added for Season 3 to the cast as MCs.

Couple List
 2PM's Nichkhun & f(x)'s Victoria (Ep 81-105)
 Kim Won-jun & Park So-hyun (Ep 81-117)
 Lee Jang-woo & T-ara's Eunjung (Ep 81-132)
 David Oh & Kwon Ri-se (Ep 92-105)
 Super Junior's Leeteuk & Kang So-ra (Ep 104-132)

Season 4

Couple List
 Super Junior's Leeteuk & Kang So-ra (Ep 133-134)
 Julien Kang & Yoon Se-ah (Ep 133-159)
 ZE:A's Hwang Kwang-hee & Secret's Han Sun-hwa (Ep 133-166)
 Lee Joon & Oh Yeon-seo (Ep 135-155)
 2AM's Jeong Jin-woon & Go Joon-hee (Ep 156-186)
 Jo Jung-chi & Choi Jung-in (Ep 160-186)
 SHINee's Lee Tae-min & Apink's Son Na-eun (Ep 167-203)
 Yoonhan & Lee So-yeon (Ep 187-213)
 Jung Joon-young & Jeong Yu-mi (Ep 187-222)
 2PM's Jang Woo-young & Park Se-young (Ep 204-237)
 Namkoong Min & Hong Jin-young (Ep 214-262)
 Hong Jong-hyun & Girl's Day's Yura (Ep 223-262)
 Song Jae-rim & Kim So-eun (Ep 238-275)
 Super Junior M's Henry Lau & Kim Ye-won (Ep 263-264, 266-275)
 CNBLUE's Lee Jong-hyun & Gong Seung-yeon (Ep 263-286)
 Oh Min-suk & Kang Ye-won (Ep 276-310)
 BtoB's Yook Sung-jae & Red Velvet's Joy (Ep 276-320)
 Kwak Si-yang & Kim So-yeon (Ep 287-316)
 Jo Se-ho & Fiestar's Cao Lu (Ep 311-314, 316-340)
 Eric Nam & Mamamoo's Solar (Ep 316-348)
 Madtown's Jota & Kim Jin-kyung (Ep 321-350)
 Choi Tae-joon & Apink's Yoon Bo-mi (Ep 341-363)
 Lee Guk-joo & Untouchable's Sleepy (Ep 349-372)
 5urprise's Gong Myung & Jung Hye-sung (Ep 351-372)
 Choi Min-yong & Jang Do-yeon (Ep 364-373)

Controversies

In late March 2010, MBC stopped broadcast of new episodes due to labour strikes, with repeats airing instead. This event, compounded with the ROKS Cheonan sinking incident, which caused cancellation of most variety shows at the time, resulted in a backlog of footage for the couples Jo Kwon & Gain and Yonghwa & Seohyun. This resulted in the contents of their latest episodes being of footage recorded some months previously, rather than the normal 1–2 weeks of the original.

During Lee Joon & Oh Yeon-seo's season 4 tenure (broadcasting from September 2012 through February 2013), Oh Yeon-seo was observed meeting in public with Lee Jang-woo, her male co-star from the drama series, Here Comes Mr. Oh. When pictures and videos were released in January 2013, media and WGM fans surmised Oh Yeon-seo and Lee Jang-woo, formerly of WGM (Season 3), were in a romantic relationship. Because Oh Yeon-seo and Lee Joon were in the midst of filming WGM at the time this news was released, the integrity of their virtual marriage was questioned by fans. The negative reaction was further exacerbated by Oh Yeon-seo's multiple declarations of romantic interest in Lee Joon (e.g. as her "ideal type" and wanting to meet with him outside of filming).  This backlash and perceived broken trust resulted in fans voicing their desire for Oh Yeon-Seo to exit WGM. Shortly after the rumors of Oh Yeon-seo and Lee Jang-woo's relationship surfaced, Lee Joon publicly expressed his frustration about not having his voice heard, with online fans suggesting it was due to his overbearing workload and/or Oh Yeon-seo's alleged relationship with Lee Jang-woo. A few weeks later, Lee Joon and Oh Yeon-seo ended their tenure on WGM.

Spin-offs

Pit-a-Pat Shake
MBC aired a new show based on We Got Married. The emphasis of the show was described as a shift from married life to the dating period. The head producer of Pit-a-Pat Shake was the original producer of We Got Married, when couples such as Seo In-young and Crown J as well as Shin Ae and Alex aired. The success of the earliest and most memorable couples gave people high hopes for the pilot. A Lunar Year Special was filmed and aired as the pilot episode.

The female idols in the spin-off Pit-a-Pat Shake were KARA's Seungyeon, After School's Lizzy, SISTAR's Hyorin, and SECRET's Sunhwa. Super Junior's Sungmin was partnered with Hyorin. MBLAQ's Lee Joon was paired with Lizzy, actor Lee Tae-sung with Seungyeon and comedian Park Heeson with Sunhwa.

Chinese version
The Chinese version of We Got Married paired Korean and Chinese celebrities. Two out of three pairings were international: T-ara's Hyomin and Super Junior's Kyuhyun. It was produced by MBC to commemorate the twentieth anniversary of South Korea's diplomatic ties with China. It aired as a Valentine's Day special in China on an entertainment channel of Shanghai Media Group and on MBC on 25 February but with only the Korean segments.

Couples
 Hyomin of T-ara & Fu Xinbo of BoBo
 Kyuhyun of Super Junior & Lou Yixiao
 MC Jin Wei & Zhu Chi Dan
 Chansung of 2PM & Liu Yan

Global Edition
A global edition spinoff of the widely popular We Got Married, get to see how the on-screen virtual marriage between idol celebrities from different countries work out through weekly missions and candid interviews. Couples are paired from Korea, Japan and Taiwan.

Season 1
Release date: April 7, 2013 - July 14, 2013
 Lee Hong-ki & Mina Fujii
 Ok Taec-yeon (2PM) & Emma Wu (Gui Gui)

Season 2
Release date: April 5, 2014 - July 12, 2014
 Heechul (Super Junior) & Puff Kuo (Dream Girls)
 Key (SHINee) & Alissa Yagi

We Are In Love
The licensed remake of popular South Korean Variety Show We Got Married, titled “We Are In Love” was broadcast starting on 19 April 2015. It has the same basic format except that the couples are not 'married' but 'dating'. This change was made in order to present a more realistic story in which couples first must be in love to form the basis of marriage and then get married.

Couples
1st Season (2015)
 Choi Si-won of Super Junior & Chinese supermodel Liu Wen
 Taiwanese Actress Ruby Lin & Actor Ren Zhong
 Chinese Singer-Actor Qiao Renliang & Actress Xu Lu

2nd Season (2016)
 Actress Song Ji-hyo (member of Running Man) & Taiwanese Actor Chen Bolin
 Hong Kong actor Shawn Yue and Chinese actress Zhou DongYu
 Chinese actress/singer Li Qin and actor Wei Daxun

Awards and nominations

References

External links

 We Got Married official MBC website 
 

 
South Korean dating and relationship reality television series
South Korean variety television shows
MBC TV original programming
2008 South Korean television series debuts
Korean-language television shows